The Sky Atis is a Czech single-place paraglider, designed and produced by Sky Paragliders of Frýdlant nad Ostravicí. It was introduced in 2003 and remained in production in 2016 as the Atis 4.

Design and development
The Atis was designed as a beginner to intermediate glider.

The design has progressed through four generations of models, the Atis, Atis 2, 3 and 4, each improving on the last. The models are each named for their relative size.

Variants

Atis
Atis XS
Extra small-sized model for lighter pilots. The glider model is DHV 1-2 certified.
Atis S
Small-sized model for lighter pilots. The glider model is DHV 1-2 certified.
Atis M
Mid-sized model for medium-weight pilots. The glider model is DHV 1-2 certified.

Atis 4
Atis 4 S
Small-sized model for lighter pilots. The glider model is EN B/LTF B certified.
Atis 4 M
Mid-sized model for medium-weight pilots. The glider model is EN B/LTF B certified.
Atis 4 L
Large-sized model for heavier pilots. The glider model is EN B/LTF B certified.
Atis 4 XL
Extra large-sized model for heavier pilots. The glider model is EN B/LTF B certified.

Specifications (Atis 4 L)

References

External links

Atis
Paragliders